V420 Aurigae is a high-mass star with an inferred compact companion. Closely orbiting each other every 0.8 days, they are a source of X-ray emission.

These coordinates were identified as an X-ray source using the Uhuru satellite in 1978, then associated with the  star V420 Aurigae by V. F. Polcaro and associates in 1984. The spectrum of the star shows rapid variation in the lines of singly-ionized iron and Balmer line emission, with these varying on a time scale of less than 300 seconds. This lends support to the presence of a compact companion. The system displays an infrared excess, suggesting it has an orbiting circumstellar envelope of gas and possibly dust. The system appears to be positioned at the center of an irregular, wispy nebula that was detected in the infrared band. One of the two filaments in this nebula appears to be connected with the system.

References

Further reading

External links
 HIC 25114
 Image V420 Aurigae

Auriga (constellation)
034921
025114
B-type subgiants
X-ray binaries
Aurigae, V420
Durchmusterung objects
Be stars